Cutten Elementary School District is a public school district in Humboldt County, California.

References 

School districts in Humboldt County, California